Eurosia ludekingi is a moth of the family Erebidae. It is found on Java.

References

 Natural History Museum Lepidoptera generic names catalog

Nudariina
Moths described in 1920
Moths of Indonesia
Insects of Java